St-Maurice railway station is a railway station in the municipality of Saint-Maurice, in the Swiss canton of Valais. It is an intermediate stop on the Simplon line and the terminus of the Saint-Gingolph–Saint-Maurice line.

Services 
 the following services stop at St-Maurice:

 RegioExpress:
 single daily round-trip to 

References

External links 
 
 
 

Railway stations in the canton of Valais
Swiss Federal Railways stations